Michele Giovanni Conti (born 3 July 1983) is an Italian motorcycle racer. He was the European 125cc champion in 2005.

Career statistics

Grand Prix motorcycle racing

By season

Races by year
(key)

Supersport World Championship

Races by year
(key)

References

External links

 Profile on MotoGP.com
 Profile on WorldSBK.com

1983 births
Living people
Italian motorcycle racers
125cc World Championship riders
Supersport World Championship riders
Sportspeople from Lecco